is a village located in Yamanashi Prefecture, Japan. , the village had an estimated population of 3,152 in 1257 households, and a population density of 32.6 persons per km².

Geography
Narusawa is located in southern Yamanashi Prefecture, in the foothills of Mount Fuji. The entire village is located within the borders of the Fuji-Hakone-Izu National Park.

Neighboring municipalities
Yamanashi Prefecture
Fujiyoshida
Fujikawaguchiko
Shizuoka Prefecture
Oyama

Climate
The city has a climate characterized by characterized by hot and humid summers, and relatively mild winters (Köppen climate classification Cfb).  The average annual temperature in Kōshū is 9.6 °C. The average annual rainfall is 1751 mm with September as the wettest month.

History
The place name "Narusawa" is mentioned in the Kamakura period chronicle Azuma Kagami as a hamlet on the road connecting Kai Province with Suruga Province. During the Edo period, all of Kai Province was tenryō territory under direct control of the Tokugawa shogunate. With the establishment of the modern municipalities system in the early Meiji period on July 1, 1889, the village of Narusawa was created within Minamitsuru District, Yamanashi Prefecture.

Demographics
Per Japanese census data, the population of Narusawa has remained relatively steady over the past several decades.

Education
Narusawa has one public elementary school operated by the village government. The village does not have a junior high school or a high school.

Transportation

Railway
Narusawa does not have any railway services

Highway

Local attractions
The Kawaguchiko Motor Museum is located in Narusawa.

Sister city relations
 - Sellières, Jura, Franche-Comté, France

References

External links

Official Website 

 
Villages in Yamanashi Prefecture